Koosah Falls, also known as Middle Falls, is the second of the three major waterfalls on the McKenzie River in the heart of the Willamette National Forest in Linn County, in the U.S. state of Oregon. The waterfall is notable for its main drop of  that plunges into a considerable pool, south of Santiam Pass. Koosah Falls is located southeast of Salem, Oregon, northeast of Eugene, Oregon and west of Mt. Washington.

See also 
 List of waterfalls in Oregon

References

Waterfalls of Oregon
Landforms of Linn County, Oregon
Willamette National Forest